Phlyarus tubericollis is a species of beetle in the family Cerambycidae. It was described by Breuning in 1967. It is known from Borneo.

References

Desmiphorini
Beetles described in 1967